Alternative culture is a type of culture that exists outside or on the fringes of mainstream or popular culture, usually under the domain of one or more subcultures. These subcultures may have little or nothing in common besides their relative obscurity, but cultural studies uses this common basis of obscurity to classify them as alternative cultures, or, taken as a whole, the alternative culture.  Compare with the more politically charged term, counterculture.

In London, Camden Town was known for its alternative culture.

See also
Alternative fashion
Alternative housing
Alternative lifestyle
Bohemianism
Counterculture
List of subcultures
History of subcultures in the 20th century
Underground culture

Further reading
The Rebel Sell: Why the Culture Can't be Jammed, Heath, Joseph & Potter, Andrew, Harper Perennial, 2004, 
The Conquest of Cool: Business Culture, Counterculture and the Rise of Hip Consumerism, Frank, Thomas, University of Chicago Press, 1998, 
Commodify Your Dissent: Salvos from The Baffler, essay collection, WW Norton & Co, 1997, 

Subcultures